Walking Across Egypt is a 1999 American coming-of-age comedy-drama film directed by Arthur Allan Seidelman and written by Paul Tamasy, based on Clyde Edgerton's novel of the same name. The film stars Ellen Burstyn, Jonathan Taylor Thomas, Mark Hamill, Gail O'Grady, Judge Reinhold, and Pat Corley.

Plot
The film follows the life of Mattie Rigsbee (Burstyn), an elderly woman who believes in strong religious convictions. The film explores the lonely qualities of life for senior citizens after their children leave as adults. Reinhold and O'Grady play Mattie's children, who live in a deep southern town.

Mattie soon finds a likable friend in the local dogcatcher, Lamar Benfield (Hamill). Through this relationship, she meets the dogcatcher's nephew, a troubled juvenile delinquent orphan, Wesley (Taylor Thomas), currently serving time in juvenile detention for a recent car theft. Mattie finds that this young man is missing direction and believes that with a little insight on Christianity, he can straighten up and fly right. In the end Mattie helped parole him beginning to live his life the right way.

Cast
 Ellen Burstyn as Mattie Rigsbee
 Jonathan Taylor Thomas as Wesley Benfield
 Mark Hamill as Lamar N. Benfield
 Pat Corley as Sheriff Tillman
 Edward Herrmann as Reverend Vernon
 Dana Ivey as Beatrice Vernon
 Harve Presnell as Finner
 Gwen Verdon as Alora
 Gail O'Grady as Elaine Rigsbee
 Judge Reinhold as Robert Rigsbee

Production
Walking Across Egypt was filmed in the Florida cities of: Ocoee (including the Ocoee Christian Church), Clermont, Windermere, Orlando, and St. Cloud.

Reception
Robert Koehler from Variety said of the film, "The best in forgiving Christian values is at the heart of well-intentioned but weakly conceived Walking Across Egypt. By far, the most distinguishing factor is Ellen Burstyn's independent-minded Southern widower Mattie,[...] but that won't be enough to stop this from going directly to family-oriented cable." Despite this, the review aggregator website Rotten Tomatoes has given it an 89% according to audience ratings.

References

External links
 
 
 
 Cinemascreen UK Review
 Nashville Scene

1999 films
1990s crime comedy-drama films
American independent films
American crime comedy-drama films
1990s English-language films
Films shot in Florida
Films scored by Marco Beltrami
Films directed by Arthur Allan Seidelman
1999 independent films
1990s American films